George R. Jamison Jr. (born September 30, 1962 in Bridgeton, New Jersey) is a former American football linebacker. After playing the 1984 and 1985 seasons in the United States Football League for the Philadelphia/Baltimore Stars, he joined the Detroit Lions in the National Football League. He also played three seasons for the Kansas City Chiefs before rejoining the Lions to finish his career.

Jamison grew up in Bridgeton, New Jersey and attended Bridgeton High School.

He lives in Rochester, Michigan and has a daughter who is going to attend Northwestern University on a basketball scholarship. He also has a son who has graduated from Bowling Green State University and is now teaching in the West Bloomfield School District.

References

1962 births
Living people
Bridgeton High School alumni
People from Bridgeton, New Jersey
American football linebackers
Cincinnati Bearcats football players
Detroit Lions players
Kansas City Chiefs players
Philadelphia/Baltimore Stars players
Players of American football from New Jersey
Sportspeople from Cumberland County, New Jersey
Ed Block Courage Award recipients